Hitoshi Sasaki can refer to:
 Hitoshi Sasaki (footballer, born 1891) (佐々木 等) - Japanese footballer
 Hitoshi Sasaki (footballer, born 1973) (佐々木 仁) - Japanese footballer